Besides is a compilation of outtakes, previously unreleased songs, and live recordings by Over the Rhine, released in 1997.  While initially intended as a fan club release (the text 'For Rhinelanders Only' appears prominently on the back jewel case insert), the disc has been available at shows and through the band's website consistently since its release.

Track listing

The People Here Are Not Shy
Hej (I Do)
My Love Is A Fever (Live)
Within Without (rough mix)
(An American DeeJay)
Last Night
Murder
Dead Weight
Bothered
All I Need Is Everything (chamber music mix)
Lucy
Miles
(Polish DeeJay)
If I'm Drowning (Live)

Personnel
Karin Bergquist: Vocals and Acoustic Guitar
Linford Detweiler: Acoustic Guitar, Bass, Piano, Mellotron
Ric Hordinski: Electric Guitar, E-Bow
Brian Kelley: Drums

Additional Personnel
Chris Dahlgren: Bass on "Miles"
Norm Johns: Cello on "All I Need Is Everything"

Over the Rhine (band) albums